Nzamba Airport  is an airstrip serving the village of Nzamba in Kwango Province, Democratic Republic of the Congo.

See also

Transport in the Democratic Republic of the Congo
List of airports in the Democratic Republic of the Congo

References

External links
 OpenStreetMap - Nzamba
 FallingRain - Nzamba Airport
 HERE Maps - Nzamba
 OurAirports - Nzamba

Airports in Kwango